The politics of Niue take place in a framework of a parliamentary representative democratic dependency, whereby the Chief Minister is the head of government, and of a non-partisan system. Niue is self-governing in free association with New Zealand and is fully responsible for internal affairs. New Zealand retains some responsibility for external affairs, in consultation with Niue. The Niue Constitution Act 1974 (NZ) vests executive authority in His Majesty the King in Right of New Zealand and the Governor-General of New Zealand. The constitution specifies that in everyday practice, it is exercised by a Cabinet of the Premier of Niue and three other ministers. The premier and ministers must be members of the Niue Assembly, the nation's legislative assembly.
The Judiciary is independent of the executive and the legislature.

Executive branch

|Monarch
|Charles III 
|
|8 September 2022
|-
|Governor-General
|Cindy Kiro
|
|28 September 2021
|-
|Premier
|Dalton Tagelagi
|Independent
|11 June 2020
|}

The monarch is hereditary; her representative in relation to Niue (the Governor-General of New Zealand) is appointed by the monarch. The New Zealand high commissioner is appointed by, and acts solely as a diplomatic agent of, the New Zealand Government. The cabinet is chosen by the premier and appointed by the Speaker of the Niue Assembly and collectively responsible to Parliament.

Cabinet 
The Cabinet is made up of four ministers, each overseeing a different portfolio. Each minister, with the exception of the Premier, has another Member of the Assembly assisting him/her in the operations of their portfolio. Each ministry also has Directory Generals serving as permanent employees of the ministries, as well as directors for each division.

Legislative branch
The Assembly has 20 members elected for a three-year term, 6 elected on a nationwide list, called the common roll, and 14 representatives of the villages. Electors must be New Zealand citizens, resident for at least three months, and candidates must have been electors, resident for twelve months. The speaker is elected from among the members.

Political parties and elections
In Niue, political parties have never played an important role. There is, at present, no political party, and candidates to elections therefore run as independents. The only party ever to have existed, the Niue People's Party, disbanded in 2003.

As there are no political parties, there is no formal parliamentary Opposition, though there are MPs who oppose the government.

Latest election

By-elections

Below is a list of recent by-elections:

Judicial branch

The Judicial Committee of the Privy Council sitting in the United Kingdom is Niue's highest court. On the island, there is a Court of Appeal (which sat in New Zealand until 2009), and the High Court of Niue.

The current chief justice is Patrick Savage. Previous chief justices include Gaven Donne (1975–1982) and Heta Kenneth Hingston, who served as such for 14 years prior to Patrick Savage.

Public Defender of Niue 
Initially, it was the Crown Counsel of New Zealand that provided legal assistance to those accused of serious offenses such as murder. In 1971, the Select Committee on the Appointment of a Public Defender recommended that the Government of Niue provide any offenders with court representation. John Funaki (a non-attorney) was the first to serve as the Public Defender of Niue in 1976. Even today, the government provides funding for a Public Defender.

Administrative divisions
Niue is divided in 14 villages each with its own village council whose members are elected and serve three-year terms.

International organization participation

 African, Caribbean, and Pacific Group of States (Cotounu Convention)
 U.N. Economic and Social Committee for Asia and the Pacific (associate)
 Intelsat (nonsignatory user)
 Pacific Islands Forum
 South Pacific Regional Trade and Economic Co-operation Agreement (SPARTECA)
 The Pacific Community (SPC)
 United Nations Educational, Scientific and Cultural Organization (UNESCO)
 World Health Organization
 World Meteorological Organization

Local government
Local Government in Niue is established under the provisions of the Niue Village Council Act 1967.  Every village in Niue have a Village council, the term in office is three years before going back to the polls.  The election of the members of the village council follows the same rules and regulations used in the General Election to elect members of the Niue Legislative Assembly (parliament).  At the first meeting of the Village Council the Chairman will be elected, including the Deputy Chair and the appointment of the Secretary/Treasurer.  The Village Council receives grants from the Government, donor agencies also fund some development projects.  The Council use to organize show days and conduct fundraising activities to generate revenue to help run some of the activities of the village.

Attorney General of Niue 
Before achieving independence in 1974, there was an Attorney General for Niue that also served as the Attorney General for New Zealand. However, it would not be until 1996 that Niue would create the official title of Attorney General after amending the Niue Act 1966. Nevertheless, the amendment would not create much of a constitutional change, and the introduction of the Interpretation Act 2004 instated the Crown Law Office as providing legal advice to the Niue government. As a result, it was advised in 2004 that the post of Attorney General be repealed.

The head of the Crown Law Office functions as a public servant, and the Public Service Commission designates the titles for the service officers. The Crown Law Office is responsible for advising the government ministries, and advises the police in regards to criminal prosecution. Due to the lack of attorneys in Niue, there are certain instances in which the office will provide legal presentation to Niue residents.

*He may have spent the majority of his service as the Acting Attorney General as the Niue government had difficulty filling the position.

See also
 Cabinet of Niue
 Electoral calendar
 Electoral system
 Foreign relations of Niue
 List of political parties by country to browse parties by country

References

External links
 Government of Niue

 
 
Niue